George V is a station on Line 1 of the Paris Métro, under the Champs-Élysées.

The station was opened on 13 August 1900, almost a month after trains began running on the original section of Line 1 between Porte de Vincennes and Porte Maillot on 19 July 1900. It was originally called Alma, after the nearby street named in honour of the Battle of Alma in the Crimean War.

On 27 May 1920 the street and station were renamed after George V of the United Kingdom in appreciation of the United Kingdom's support for France during World War I. The station entrance is located between Rue de Bassano and Avenue George V on the Champs-Élysées.

Station layout

See also
Similarly named places:
 Hotel George V, Paris
 King George V DLR station, London
Nearby stations:
Charles de Gaulle–Étoile
Franklin D. Roosevelt

References
 Roland, Gérard (2003). Stations de métro. D’Abbesses à Wagram. Éditions Bonneton.

Paris Métro stations in the 8th arrondissement of Paris
Railway stations in France opened in 1900